Joseph Macdonald (1863–?) was a Canadian lawyer and politician.

Joseph Macdonald may also refer to:

Joseph MacDonald (politician) (1824–?), political figure in Nova Scotia, Canada
Joseph MacDonald (1906–1968), American cinematographer
J. Farrell MacDonald (1875–1952), American character actor and director
Joe MacDonald (architect), Canadian-born American architect, researcher and professor
Joseph Faber MacDonald, Canadian Roman Catholic bishop

See also
Joseph McDonald (disambiguation)